Elba Leonor Diaz Soccarras (born c. 1935) is a Colombian-born American amnesiac whose origins and identity were unknown to New Jersey authorities from 1994 to 2009.

History
Soccarras was found in 1994 at the Woodbridge Center in Woodbridge Township, New Jersey. She spoke Spanish, had no memory of her identity, and did not carry any identification. She recalled her name as "Elba."

Elba was placed in the Garrett Hagedorn Psychiatric Hospital in Hunterdon County, New Jersey where she was diagnosed with Alzheimer's disease.

In 2008, New Jersey officials renewed a canvassing campaign across the state, as well as in Colombia and Venezuela, in an effort to discover her true identity.

In March 2009, through tips from the public and aid from the Colombian consulate, authorities were able to identify her as 74-year-old Elba Leonor Diaz Soccarras, who had immigrated from Colombia to the United States in 1969. As a single mother, she had worked for years in a factory. By establishing her citizenship, authorities were able to transfer her from Garrett Hagedorn Psychiatric Hospital to a nursing home.

See also
Missing person

References

1930s births
Living people
People from Woodbridge Township, New Jersey
American people of Colombian descent
People with Alzheimer's disease